Kodopa was a town of ancient Lycia, which per the Stadiasmus Patarensis was the destination of a road from Choma.

References

Populated places in ancient Lycia
Former populated places in Turkey
Lost ancient cities and towns